Selvarasa is a Tamil-language name that can be used as a given name or surname. Notable people with the name include:

P. Selvarasa (born 1946), a Sri Lankan politician
Selvarasa Pathmanathan (born 1955), a Sri Lankan politician associated with the Liberation Tigers of Tamil Eelam